Emma Hunter (born 19 March 1990) is a Samoan New Zealander swimmer. Born in Samoa, she now lives in Auckland, New Zealand.

Biography
In 2008, she became Samoa's first-ever female Olympic swimmer, by representing Samoa in freestyle and butterfly events at the Beijing Olympics. Hunter previously represented Samoa in freestyle and butterfly events at the 2007 World Aquatics Championships in Melbourne. She failed to qualify past the heat stages. She represented Samoa at the 2007 South Pacific Games. She won a Silver in the 5 km Open Water Swim and a Bronze in the 400m Freestyle. She became the first Samoan swimmer to gain medals at the South Pacific Games. She was also Deputy Head Girl (2008) at the Papatoetoe High School in Auckland.

References

http://www.sportingpulse.com/assoc_page.cgi?client=2-3571-0-0-0&sID=44063&&news_task=DETAIL&articleID=4345331
http://www.gettyimages.co.nz/detail/news-photo/12th-fina-world-championships-samoa-emma-hunter-in-action-news-photo/81452798

Living people
Samoan female swimmers
New Zealand sportspeople of Samoan descent
New Zealand female swimmers
Samoan female freestyle swimmers
Female butterfly swimmers
1990 births
Swimmers from Auckland
People educated at Papatoetoe High School